Ẓulm is the Arabic word used interchangeably for cruelty or unjust acts of exploitation, oppression, and wrongdoing, whereby a person either deprives others of their rights or does not fulfill his obligations towards them. In Turkish, it is known as zulüm and other cognates of this word are prevalent in several Semtic and Indo-European languages.

A person who commits zulm is called a "ظالم zaalim".

In the Islamic context injustice or acts of cruelty are attributed to human acts and not to Allah: God does not do injustice to anyone. It is the people who do injustice to themselves.

References

Islamic terminology
Arabic words and phrases
Urdu-language words and phrases
Turkish words and phrases
Bengali words and phrases

ar:ظلم